Shlomo Touboul is an Israeli business executive and inventor who has founded several companies including Finjan and Shany (or Shani) Computers. He is currently the President and CEO of Illusive Networks, a startup from the Israel-based incubator, Team8.

Career

Touboul's career began in earnest with the founding of Shani (or Shany) Computers in 1985. The Israeli company and its California subsidiary were sold to Intel in 1994 for between $15 million and $20 million. This sale marked the first time a United States corporation had come to Israel to purchase a startup. He went on to work for Intel as a manager in their Network Management Business Unit. In 1996, he founded Finjan Software Inc. The company designed and patented antivirus software and anti-spyware software. In 1997, the company received $10 million in investor funding.

In 2000, Touboul left Finjan to start Runway, Israel's first internet incubator, and Runway Telecom Partners, an Israeli telecommunications incubator co-founded with Alcatel. Alcatel invested $14 million in Runway Telecom in 2001. Also in 2001, Finjan encountered financial difficulties and Touboul returned to the company at the request of investor, David Cowan of Bessemer Venture Partners. As CEO of Finjan, Touboul often spoke about the risks of advanced spyware and the security gaps in programs and programming languages like JavaScript. He also invented new technologies, including static and dynamic code behavior analysis and behavior based blocking technology. Touboul helped aggressively market Finjan's proactive defense technology, and McAfee incorporated that technology into their products. Touboul also pushed for more funding. Finjan secured $8.5 million in funding from an investor group led by Benchmark Capital Israel, Israel Seed Partners, and Bessemer Venture Partners. This brought the total amount of funding to $31.5 million over the course of 6 years. Touboul helped Finjan earn an additional $10 million in funding in 2004 from investors including Cisco Systems, Bessemer Venture Partners, Israel Seed Partners, and Benchmark Capital.

Finjan terminated Touboul in July 2005. He started Yoggie Security Systems 3 weeks after his departure from Finjan. This new company designed hardware to solve security issues for individuals using laptops or mobile devices on a public Wi-Fi signal. The hardware also kept security tasks separate from the computer's main CPU, implementing the first security dedicated coprocessor for networked based computers and devices. Touboul invented 8 patents for Yoggie. Among the Yoggie products are the Yoggie Gatekeeper Pico and the Gatekeeper Card. Within the first year of its operation, Yoggie received $1.8 million in investment funding from investors in Silicon Valley, Israel, and New York City (including Earlybird Venture Capital). In total, Touboul helped raise around $18 million in funding for Yoggie, and the company was eventually sold to Norway-based Cupp Computing in 2011.

In 2014, Touboul became the CEO of Illusive Networks, a company founded by Ofer Israeli and Israeli incubator, Team8. Illusive Networks received $5 million in Series A funding from Team8 which had a capital investment of $18 million from investors like Google Chairman Eric Schmidt's Innovation Endeavor, Marker LLC, Cisco, Alcatel, Bessemer Venture Partners, and others. The company provides information security by deliberately deceiving hackers and tricking them into collecting and using information that is false. The software provides early detection of attacks and advanced persistent threats. Touboul is the current CEO of the company.

Patents

 Method and apparatus for monitoring and controlling in a network filed August 25, 1997; issued September 26, 2000
 System and method for protecting a client during runtime from hostile downloadables filed April 18, 2000; issued November 12, 2002
 Method and apparatus for monitoring and controlling programs in a network filed July 30, 2003; issued March 18, 2004
 Methods and systems for auto-marking, watermarking, auditing, reporting, tracing and policy enforcement via e-mail and networking systems filed October 7, 2003; issued August 5, 2004
 System and method for protecting a computer and a network from hostile downloadables filed March 30, 2000; issued October 12, 2004
 Method and system for caching at secure gateways filed May 3, 2004; issued August 26, 2008
 Policy-based caching filed February 27, 2003; issued November 15, 2005
 Method and system for adaptive rule-based content scanners for desktop computers filed December 9, 2004; issued July 5, 2011
 System and Method for Implementing Content and Network Security Inside a Chip filed March 11, 2009; issued October 1, 2009
 Embedding management data within HTTP messages filed January 30, 2004; issued July 13, 2010
 System and method for providing network security to mobile devices filed January 7, 2013; issued January 7, 2014
 Malicious Mobile Code Runtime Monitoring System and Methods filed February 11, 2015; issued June 25, 2015

References

External links
Illusive Networks Official Website

Israeli business executives
Living people
Year of birth missing (living people)
Israeli inventors